Count Johan Christopher Toll (1 February 1743 – 21 May 1817), Swedish statesman and soldier, was born at Mölleröd in Scania (now part of Hässleholm Municipality, Skåne County). Toll came of an ancient family, of Dutch origin, which can be traced back to the 13th century, but migrated to the Baltic provinces in the 16th century.

Toll's father was one of Charles XII's warriors, his mother a descendant of the aristocratic Gyllenstjernas. In his youth Johan Christopher served in the Seven Years' War, and then, exchanging the military for the civil service, became head ranger or överjägmästare of the Kristianstad County.

Royal conspirator 
During the Riksdag of 1771-1772 the dominant "Caps" deprived him of his post, and Toll, shrewdly guessing that the king was preparing a revolution, almost forced his services on the conspirators, Georg Magnus Sprengtporten declaring that a man who knew so much of their most secret plans must either "be killed or squared" To Toll was assigned by far the most difficult part of the enterprise. It was his business to secure the important southern fortress of Kristianstad. Two days after the coronation, on 21 May 1772, he set forth from Stockholm with twenty-two pounds wherewith to corrupt a garrison and revolt a province. He had no sort of credentials, and the little that was known about him locally from the official point of view was not to his credit. Finally, in the fortress itself there was but one man known to be a safe royalist, namely, Captain Abraham Hellichius. On 21 June Toll reached Kristianstad. By sheer bluff Toll first won over Hellichius, and, six weeks later (12 August), the whole garrison of Kristianstad, arresting the few officers who proved recalcitrant; taking possession of the records and military chest, and closing the gates in the face of the "Cap" high commissioner who had been warned by the English minister, John Gooderich, that something was afoot in the south. Seven days later Gustav III's coup d'état - at Stockholm completed the revolution.

Politician 
Toll was liberally rewarded and more and more frequently employed as his genius as an administrator and his blameless integrity came to light. His reforms in the commissariat department were epoch-making, and the superior mobility of the Swedish forces under Gustav III was due entirely to his initiative. But it was upon Toll's boundless audacity that Gustav chiefly relied. Thus as Gustav, under the pressure of circumstances, inclined more and more towards absolutism, it was upon Toll that he principally leant. In 1783, Toll was placed at the head of the secret "Commission of National Defence " which ruled Sweden during the king's absence abroad without the privity of the Council. It was he who persuaded the king to summon the Riksdag of 1786, which, however, he failed to control, and in all Gustav's plans for forcing on a war with Russia Toll was initiated from the first. In 1786 he had already risen to the rank of major-general and was Gustav's principal adjutant. It was against Toll's advice, however, that Gustav, in 1788, began the war with Russia. Toll had always insisted that, in such a contingency, Sweden should be militarily as well as diplomatically prepared, but this was far from being the case. Nevertheless, when the inevitable first disasters happened, Toll was, most unjustly, made a scapegoat, but the later successes of the war were largely due to his care and diligence as commissary-general. After the death of Gustav III Toll was for a short time war minister and commander-in-chief in Scania and, subsequently, was sent as ambassador to Warsaw. Unjustly involved in the so-called "Armfelt conspiracy" he was condemned to two years imprisonment; but was fully reinstated when in 1796 Gustav IV attained his majority. At the Riksdag at Norrköping in 1800, he was elected marshal of the Diet (Lantmarskalk), and led the royalist party with consummate ability. On this occasion he forced the mutinous nobility or riddarhuset to accept the detested Act of Union and Security by threatening to reveal the names of all the persons suspected of complicity in the murder of the late king. Subsequently he displayed great diplomatic adroitness in his negotiations with the powers concerning Sweden's participation in the war against Napoleon.

Military commander 
In the Franco-Swedish War, Toll assisted in the defence of Stralsund. The fortress was compelled to surrender on 20 August by Marshal Brune, whereupon the Swedish army of 13,000 men, which had retired to Rügen, seemed irretrievably lost. It was saved by Toll, who cajoled the French marshal into a convention whereby the Swedish army, with all its munitions of war, was permitted to return unmolested to Sweden on 7 September 1807. For this exploit Toll received his marshal's baton. It was in the camp of Toll, then acting commander-in-chief in Scania, that Gustavus IV was about to take refuge when the western army rebelled against him, but he was arrested in the capital before he could do so. Toll retained his high position under Bernadotte, who, in 1814, created him a count. He died unmarried.

References

External links

1743 births
1817 deaths
People from Hässleholm Municipality
Field marshals of Sweden
Governors-General of Sweden
Swedish nobility
Swedish people of Dutch descent
Lord Marshals of the Riksdag of the Estates
19th-century Swedish politicians
Swedish military commanders of the Napoleonic Wars
Swedish monarchists
Gustavian era people
18th-century Swedish politicians